Paul Monsky (born June 17, 1936) is an American mathematician and professor at Brandeis University.

After earning a bachelor's degree from Swarthmore College, he received his Ph.D. in 1962 from the University of Chicago under the supervision of Walter Lewis Baily, Jr. He has introduced the Monsky–Washnitzer cohomology and he has worked intensively on Hilbert–Kunz functions and Hilbert–Kunz multiplicity. In 2007, Monsky and Holger Brenner gave an example showing that tight closure does not commute with localization.

Monsky's theorem, the statement that a square cannot be divided into an odd number of equal-area triangles, is named after Monsky, who published the first proof of it in 1970.

In the mid-1970s, Monsky stopped paying U.S. federal income tax in protest against military spending. He resisted income tax withholding by claiming extra exemptions, and this led to a criminal conviction on tax charges in 1980.

References

External links 
 Monsky's home page at Brandeis University
 Preprint on the example of Monsky and Brenner that tight closure does not commute with localization.

1936 births
Living people
20th-century American mathematicians
21st-century American mathematicians
Algebraists
American tax resisters